2-Chloromethylpyridine is an organohalide that consists of a pyridine core bearing a chloromethyl group. It is one of three isomeric chloromethylpyridines, along with 3- and 4-chloromethylpyridine. It is an alkylating agent. 2-Chloromethylpyridine is a precursor to pyridine-containing ligands.

Safety
2-Chloromethylpyridine is an analogue of nitrogen mustards, and has been investigated for its mutagenicity.

References 

Alkylating agents
Organochlorides
2-Pyridyl compounds
IARC Group 1 carcinogens